The 1926 Northern Illinois State Teachers football team represented Northern Illinois State Teachers College—now known as Northern Illinois University—as an independent during the 1926 college football season. Led by first-year head coach Roland Cowell, the Teachers compiled a record of 5–1–1 record. Northern Illinois State played home games at Glidden Field, located on the east end of campus in DeKalb, Illinois.Wesley Cocidine was the team's captain.

Schedule

References

Northern Illinois State
Northern Illinois Huskies football seasons
Northern Illinois State Teachers football